Visor och oförskämdheter (English: Songs and impertinencies) is a live album, featuring Swedish folk musicians Cornelis Vreeswijk, Fred Åkerström and Ann-Louise Hanson.  It was recorded live in Stockholm's Concert hall in December 1964. Prior to this album, Vreeswijk was forced to decide whether or not to continue his studies or pursue music. He decided to stop studying and embarked on a tour with Fred Åkerström and Ann-Louise Hanson, during which this album was recorded.

Track listing 
Fredman's Epistel No. 2 – "Nå skruva fiolen" - 1:44
"Duett i Småland" - 2:16
"Teddybjörnen" - 1:20
"Man borde inte sova" - 3:09
"I Spaniens månsken" - 2:40
"Fröken Saga / Visan om bomben" - 4:29
"I natt jag drömde något som" - 2:03
"Vidalita" - 3:33
"Brev från kolonien" - 3:06
"De stora eventyre" - 2:01
"Elin och herremannen" - 3:50
"Milan" - 0:37
"Morgon efter regn" - 2:23
"Mördar-Anders" - 2:07
"Rallarvisa" - 2:34

Personnel 
Cornelis Vreeswijk – vocal, acoustic guitar
Fred Åkerström – vocal, acoustic guitar
Ann-Louise Hanson – vocal
 Nils Hellmark – guitar

References 

Fred Åkerström albums
Swedish-language live albums
1964 live albums
Cornelis Vreeswijk live albums
Ann-Louise Hanson albums